Khao Tao railway station is a railway station located in Nong Kae Subdistrict, Hua Hin District, Prachuap Khiri Khan.

2009 rail accident 
On 5 October 2009, at 04:20 am, Express No. 84 Trang-Bangkok derailed at Khao Tao Railway Station when it was entering a passing loop at 105 km/h. It was believed to have been caused by the driver falling asleep on duty. This was due to the fact that, at Wang Phong, the train was supposed to be collecting a schedule for stopping at certain passing loops for train crossing. However, the train sped through and went past a red light into the Wang Phong-Khao Tao section. At Khao Tao, a freight train was stopped, and in order to clear the way, the express had to be switched to the passing loop at Khao Tao. The express went beyond the speed limit and thus causing 6 carriages to derail. The accident caused 7 deaths and 88 injuries, at an estimated total of about 230 million baht in losses. Train services on the Southern Line were suspended for the rest of the day. This accident was one of the worst rail accidents throughout the railway's history.

Train services 
 Ordinary 251/252 Bang Sue Junction-Prachuap Khiri Khan-Bang Sue Junction
 Ordinary 254 Lang Suan-Thon Buri

References 
 
 
 

Railway stations in Thailand